Reach for Glory is a 1962 British film adaptation of John Rae's 1961 novel, The Custard Boys, directed by Philip Leacock. It received a United Nations Award.

Plot 
A group of boys, evacuated during World War II from London to a coastal town, form a gang and play war games. Too young to fight in the war and afraid it will be over by the time they come of age, the group members, who are also in the school's Army Cadet Force, initiate a battle with the local teenagers. Curlew, a local youth, invites an Austrian Jewish refugee with whom he has formed a close relationship to take part in the shenanigans. At first the Jewish boy, Stein, is scorned because of his "Germanic" heritage but is later allowed to join. When Stein runs off during a fight, the youths decide to give him a fake court-martial and execution, but real bullets are used by a freak mistake and Stein is killed.

Cast 
 Harry Andrews - Capt. Curlew
 Kay Walsh - Mrs. Curlew
 Michael Anderson Jr - Lewis Craig
 Oliver Grimm - Mark Stein
 Martin Tomlinson - John Curlew
 Freddie Eldrett - Willy Aldrich
 James Luck - Michael Freen
 John Coker - Peter Joy
 Michael Trubshawe - Maj. Burton
 Arthur Hewlett - Vicar
 Cameron Hall - Headmaster
 Allan Jeayes - Crabtree
 Richard Vernon - Dr. Aldrich
 Russell Waters - Mr. Freeman
 Patricia Hayes - Mrs. Freeman
 George Pravda - Mr. Stein
 John Rae - Lance Freeman
 Alexis Kanner - Steven
 Peter Furnell - Arthur Chettle
 John Pike - Felix
 Melvin Baker - Chettle's Lieutenant

Crew 
Director
 Philip Leacock
Producers
 Jud Kinberg	
 John Kohn
Music by
 Bob Russell
Cinematography
 Robert Huke
Film editing 
 Frederick Wilson
Art direction 
 John Blezard
Production Management
 Timothy Burrill (unit manager)
 Fred Gunn (production manager)
Assistant Director
 David Tomblin
Sound Department 
 Maurice Askew (sound recordist)
 Cyril Collick (sound recordist)
 Don Sharpe (dubbing editor)
Camera operator
 Ronnie Maasz
Music Department
 Raymond Premru (conductor)
 Bob Russell (lyricist: special lyrics)
Misc
 Maurice Binder (title designer)
 Eileen Head (continuity)

References

External links

1962 films
1962 drama films
Films based on British novels
British black-and-white films
Films directed by Philip Leacock
Columbia Pictures films
British drama films
Films set on the home front during World War II
1960s English-language films
1960s British films